Procession is the eleventh studio album by the jazz fusion band Weather Report. It was released in 1983 through Columbia Records. Although several previous Weather Report tracks included wordless singing, and "And Then" from Mr. Gone included brief lyrics, "Where the Moon Goes" was the band's first track including lyrics throughout, sung by members of The Manhattan Transfer. The band would continue to feature vocals on the next three studio albums.

Critical reception

Reviewing the album in Record, Steve Futterman dismissed Procession as being competently crafted but too similar to Weather Report's previous albums to be of any interest. Noting the band's change in lineup, he stated, "Integrating new members, finding what they can offer and letting them stir things up can give an established band a welcome jolt of creativity, of fresh ideas. But in Weather Report's case, the overwhelming control of co-leaders Joe Zawinul and Wayne Shorter has reined in the skills of bassist Victor Bailey, drummer Omar Hakim and percussionist José Rossy in service of highly crafted but essentially petrified music."

Track listing 
"Procession" (Josef Zawinul) – 8:42
"Plaza Real" (Wayne Shorter) – 5:30
"Two Lines" (Zawinul) – 7:43
"Where the Moon Goes" (Zawinul, lyrics by Nan O'Byrne and Zawinul) – 7:50
"The Well" (Shorter, Zawinul) – 4:00
"Molasses Run" (Omar Hakim) – 5:49

Personnel 
Weather Report
Josef Zawinul - keyboards
Wayne Shorter - tenor and soprano saxophones
Omar Hakim - drums, guitar, vocals
Victor Bailey - bass
José Rossy - percussion, concertina
with:
The Manhattan Transfer - vocals on "Where the Moon Goes"
Technical
Neil Dorfsman, Tom Fouce, Mitch Gibson, Tom Miller - engineer
John Lykes - cover artwork
Bruce Talamon - photography

References

External links 

 Weather Report Annotated Discography: Procession

1983 albums
Columbia Records albums
Weather Report albums